S.Ha.R.K. (the acronym stands for Soft Hard Real-time Kernel) is a completely configurable kernel architecture designed for supporting hard, soft, and non real-time applications with interchangeable scheduling algorithms.

Main features
The kernel architecture's main benefit is that an application can be developed independently from a particular system configuration. This allows new modules to be added or replaced in the same application, so that specific scheduling policies can be evaluated for predictability, overhead and performance.

Applications
S.Ha.R.K. was developed at RETIS Lab, a research facility of the Sant'Anna School of Advanced Studies, and at the University of Pavia, as a tool for teaching, testing and developing real-time software systems. It is used for teaching at many universities, including the Sant'Anna School of Advanced Studies and Malardalens University in Sweden.

Modularity
Unlike the kernels in traditional operating systems, S.Ha.R.K. is fully modular in terms of scheduling policies, aperiodic servers, and concurrency control protocols. Modularity is achieved by partitioning system activities between a generic kernel and a set of modules, which can be registered at initialization to configure the kernel according to specific application requirements.

History
S.Ha.R.K. is the evolution of the Hartik Kernel and it is based on the OSLib Project.

See also

Real-time operating system

External links
The S.Ha.R.K. Project official site

Real-time operating systems
Free software operating systems